Jill Hood-Linzee (18 October 1928 – 17 June 2007) was a British figure skater. She competed in the ladies' singles event at the 1948 Winter Olympics.

References

1928 births
2007 deaths
British female single skaters
Olympic figure skaters of Great Britain
Figure skaters at the 1948 Winter Olympics
People from Surbiton